The Young rider classification in the Giro d'Italia was added to the Giro d'Italia in 1976 for the younger riders in the race. The classification is calculated in the same way as the general classification, with the riders times being totaled together after each stage; however, the classification is restricted to those no older than 25 years during the calendar year of the race. Between 1976 and 1994 the classification had different qualifications. The leader of the classification is awarded a white jersey (maglia bianca).

The classification was discontinued after the 1994 Giro d'Italia. However, it was reintroduced in 2007, with the age limit increased to 25 years.

Winners

 The "Year" column refers to the year the competition was held, and wikilinks to the article about that season.
 The "Distance" column refers to the distance over which the race was held.
 The "Margin" column refers to the margin of time or points by which the winner defeated the runner-up.
 The "Stage wins" column refers to the number of stage wins the winner had during the race.

References

Giro d'Italia
Cycling jerseys
Italian sports trophies and awards